Chaetophractus is a small genus of armadillos in the family Chlamyphoridae. It contains the following three species:

Members of the genus are endemic to the continent of South America. They are found in the central and southern countries such as Argentina, Bolivia, Chile, and Paraguay.

Chaetophractus nationi is probably a junior synonym of Chaetophractus vellerosus and the genus Chatophractus may be paraphyletic.

References

Armadillos
Mammal genera
Taxa named by Leopold Fitzinger
Taxonomy articles created by Polbot